In Chinese art, the Four Gentlemen or Four Noble Ones," is a collective term referring to four plants: the plum blossom, the orchid, the bamboo, and the chrysanthemum.  The term compares the four plants to Confucian junzi, or "gentlemen." They are commonly depicted in bird-and-flower paintings, a broad category of classical Chinese art, and they are particularly popular subjects for ink and wash painting.  

The Four Gentlemen are a recurring theme in art because of their long history of symbolism for traditional Chinese virtues such as uprightness, purity, humility, perseverance against harsh conditions. Each of them represent a different season (the plum blossom for winter, the orchid for spring, the bamboo for summer, and the chrysanthemum for autumn), the four are used to depict the unfolding of the seasons through the year. 

The Four Gentlemen have been used in Chinese painting since the time of the Song dynasty (960–1279) and were later adopted elsewhere in East Asia by artists in Korea, Japan, and Vietnam.

Gallery

See also
 Three Friends of Winter
 Flowers of the Four Seasons

References

External links
 Paintings of the Four Gentlemen at China Online Museum

Chinese painting
Korean painting
Japanese painting
Vietnamese painting
East Asian culture
Chinese iconography
Vietnamese iconography
Japanese iconography
Plants in art
Korean traditions